Lifestyle You (stylised as Lifestyle YOU) was an Australian subscription TV channel. It was a sister channel to Lifestyle, Lifestyle Home and Lifestyle Food. Lifestyle You was home to personal makeovers, hilarious and honest reality, health, wellness, family and relationship programming.

In August 2017, Foxtel announced that Lifestyle You would end in October and that its content would move to Lifestyle and Arena.

Original programming
Trinny & Susannah's Australian Makeover Mission (2011)
Eat Yourself Sexy Australia (2011)
Wife Swap Australia (2012)
Embarrassing Bodies Down Under (2013)
Meet the Frockers (2014)

Logo history

See also 
 Lifestyle
 Lifestyle Food
 Lifestyle Home

References

External links
Official website

Television networks in Australia
Defunct television channels in Australia
English-language television stations in Australia
Television channels and stations established in 2009
Television channels and stations disestablished in 2017
2009 establishments in Australia
2017 disestablishments in Australia
Foxtel